Joshua Starnes (born September 2, 1976) is an American animation writer, comic book publisher film critic for ComingSoon.net and president of the Houston Film Critics Society.

Career
Starnes was introduced to film criticism by his father while a high school student in Houston, Texas and began writing regularly for ComingSoon.net, a subsidiary of Crave Online, in 2004 where he shares reviewing duties with Edward Douglas and Scott Chitwood. In 2009 he became vice president of the Houston Film Critics Society, and in 2012 he became president.

In 2015 he joined Red 5 Comics as co-publisher, expanding its line and partnering with King Features and Armory Films to develop new properties.  He is the author of the graphic novels Spook with Lisandro Estherren and The Box with Raymond Estrada.

He is the co-writer for Kulipari: Dream Walker, starring Mark Hamill.

References

External links
Joshua Starnes' profile at IMDb
Joshua Starnes' profile at Rotten Tomatoes
The Houston Film Critics Society
Red 5 Comics
ComingSoon.net
Vital Thrills

1976 births
Living people
American film critics
Writers from Houston
Writers from North Carolina